Pip is a name of English origin. It is a nickname for individuals named Philip or Philippa. Other variants include Pipkin, Pippin, Pippa, and Piper.

 Pip Adam, New Zealand novelist
 Philip Baker, one half of Pip and Jane Baker, a British television writing team
 Pip Blackwell (born 1974), English darts player
 Pip Borrman (born 1954-2009), Australian pilot
 Pip Branfield (born 1952), English lawn bowler 
 Pip Broughton (born 1957), English film director
 Phillipa Brown (born 1979), stage name Ladyhawke (musician), New Zealand singer, songwriter and musician
 Percy Jack Clayson (1896-?), British First World War flying ace
 Pip Courtney, Australian journalist
 Tirso Cruz III (born 1952), Filipino actor and singer
 Pip Elson (born 1954), English golfer
 Arthur Fielder (1877-1949), English cricketer
 Philip John Gardner (1914-2003), English recipient of the Victoria Cross
 Philip Hugh Whitby Hicks (1895-1967), British Army brigadier general 
 Pip Karmel (born 1963), Australian film director, editor and screenwriter
 Pip Millett, English musician
 Patrick Playfair (1889-1974), Royal Flying Corps officer and Royal Air Force air marshal
 Pip Proud (1947–2010), Australian singer-songwriter, poet, novelist and dramatist
 Pip Pyle (1950-2006), English-born drummer
 Pip Rippon (1888-1950), English footballer
 Philip Roberts (British Army officer) (1906-1997), British Army major general 
 Philippa Tattersall (born 1975), only woman to pass the All Arms Commando Course to join the British Royal Marines
 Pip Torrens (born 1960), English actor
 Pip Williams (born 1947), British musician and record producer

See also
 Philip "Pip" Pirrip, the protagonist of Dickens' Great Expectations.
 Pip Pirrup, a minor character from South Park.
 Josef Priller (1915–1961), German fighter ace nicknamed "Pips"

Lists of people by nickname